Harper Mountain is the name of a ski area located outside of Kamloops, British Columbia, Canada (the name of the actual mountain it is located on is Mount Harper).

The mountain has a vertical drop of 427 m (1,400 ft), a base elevation of 1,100 m (3,600 ft) and a top elevation of 1,524 m (5,000 ft). It offers 400 acres (1.2 km2) of skiable area on 15 different trails. In terms of lifts, it has one chair lift, one T-bar, and one rope tow. The mountain also has a terrain park, a snow tube park, cross country skiing, and a skating pond.

Although Harper Mountain does not offer the amenities of larger resorts such as hotels, restaurants, and specialty stores, it does have a log-construction ski lodge, an equipment rental shop, and offers ski and snowboard lessons.

Trails

See also
List of ski areas and resorts in Canada

References

External links
 Harper Mountain
 Snow Canada

Ski areas and resorts in British Columbia
Tourism in British Columbia
Thompson Country